Abbasabad-e Zargham (also Romanized as ‘Abbāsābād-e Ẕarghām; also known as ‘Abbāsābād) is a village in Sharifabad Rural District, Sharifabad District, Pakdasht County, Tehran Province, Iran. At the 2006 census, its population was 2,518, in 782 families.

References 

Populated places in Pakdasht County